Roshnee is an Indian township associated with Vereeniging in Gauteng.

History 
The township was established under the Group Areas Act by the Vereeniging Town Council and the apartheid government as a segregated housing development for Indians living in the Vaal Triangle in the late 1960s. The adjoining Indian township of Dadaville was created to alleviate housing shortages in Roshnee.

In the 2010s, some Muslim residents of Roshnee died fighting for ISIS, amidst concerns that fighters and money from Roshnee were finding their way to ISIS however community groups later rejected the precepts of ISIS.

The Vereenging Airport FAVV is located east of the town.

Education 

 Roshnee Primary School
 Roshnee Secondary School
 Roshnee Islamic School

Sports 

 Roshnee Stadium

References 

Former Indian townships in South Africa
Townships in Gauteng